The Fort de Salses (also called Forteresse de Salses) is a Catalan fortress in the commune of Salses-le-Château, situated in the French département of Pyrénées-Orientales. It is clearly visible from the A9 autoroute as well as the train line between Perpignan and Narbonne and it is possible to visit from the motorway rest area and the local train station.

Built by the Aragonese at the end of the 15th century, the fortress guarded the former frontier between Principality of Catalonia and France. Its layout and architecture, innovative for the time, present a rare example of the transition between medieval castle and the fortresses of the modern period.
The fort was captured by the French in 1642, and remained French after the Treaty of the Pyrenees.

Fort de Salses is listed as a monument historique by the French Ministry of Culture, and is operated by the Centre des monuments nationaux. The fortress receives 100,000 visitors a year.

During the Spanish Civil War, the fort was used as a refuge.

See also
 List of castles in France

References

External links 
 Forteresse de Salses - Centre des monuments nationaux
 
 

Castles in Pyrénées-Orientales
Monuments historiques of Pyrénées-Orientales
Forts in France
Historic house museums in Occitania (administrative region)
Museums in Pyrénées-Orientales
Buildings and structures completed in the 15th century
Monuments of the Centre des monuments nationaux